Dr. Ivan Seliminski  (1799 – 1866) was a prominent Bulgarian philosopher, scholar, teacher and medical doctor.

Education 
He was born in Sliven in 1799. Later, he took the name of this town as his surname. His early school years were spent in a Greek school in Sliven. His secondary education was in Kidonia. He traveled in Europe.

Teacher 

Seliminski returned to Sliven in 1825. He opened a school in which he taught physics. His school became one of the first Bulgarian lower-level secondary schools.

Evacuation in Bessarabia 

On the eve of the Russian-Turkish War (1828–1829) he organized many Bulgarians to support the Russian army. With the creation of revolutionary organizations in Sliven and some other cities, Seliminski became the first major Bulgarian revolutionary. After the war Seliminski participated in Russian delegations. Many Bulgarian people left their homes and emigrated to the other side of the Danube in Vlahia. Ivan Seliminski opened a school and was a teacher in New Sliven (now Berjazka) and Bucharest.

Medical doctor 
From 1840 to 1844 Seliminski studied medicine in Athens. After that he traveled to Paris (1845) and practiced as a medical doctor in Bucharest, Braila and Bessarabia until the end of his life (1845–1866).

References 
 М. Арнаудов, Д-р Иван Селимински, Български образи, София, Хемус (1944)
 Ц. Кристанов, И. Пенаков, С. Маслев, Д-р Иван Селимиски, София, БАН (1962)
 Д-р Иван Селимински, Избрани съчинения, София, Наука и изкуство (1979)
 М. Борисов, Д-р Иван Селимински и физиката. – Природа, № 5, 79–86 (1983)
 М. Борисов, А. Ваврек, Г. Камишева, Д-р Иван Селимински - основоположник на обучението по физика у нас и пропагандатор на физическите науки и тяхното значение, Предшественици на разпространението и развитието на физическите науки в България, София, изд. Народна Просвета (1985) с. 67-127

1799 births
1866 deaths
Bulgarian philosophers
Bulgarian schoolteachers
19th-century Bulgarian physicians
Writers from Sliven
Bulgarian expatriates in Romania
Bulgarian memoirists
19th-century memoirists